Colin Larson is a former state representative from Littleton, Colorado. A Republican, Larson represented Colorado House of Representatives District 22, which encompassed the southern Jefferson County communities of Bow Mar, Columbine, Dakota Ridge, Ken Caryl, and Littleton.

Background
Larson earned a political science degree from Colorado College.

Election
Larson was first elected as a state representative in the 2018 general elections. In that election, he defeated his Democratic Party opponent, winning 53.63% of the vote. In the 2022 Colorado House elections, Larson was redistricted to the 25th district and lost his re-election bid to Tammy Story in what media outlets considered an unexpected loss. Larson was poised to become the House minority leader in the upcoming legislative session.

References

External links
 Campaign website
 State House website

21st-century American politicians
Living people
Republican Party members of the Colorado House of Representatives
People from Littleton, Colorado
Colorado College alumni
21st-century American businesspeople
Year of birth missing (living people)